The Karnataka School Examination and Assessment Board, shortly as KSEAB, is a state education board of Karnataka. KSEAB came into existence in the year 1966. The Board conducts the SSLC (Tenth) Examination in March / April each year and other examinations are also conducted by this board.

The board regulates and supervises the system of Secondary education in Karnataka State. It executes and governs various activities that include devising of courses of study, prescribing syllabus, conducting examinations, granting recognitions to schools and, providing direction, support and leadership for all secondary educational institutions under its jurisdiction. There are further few open and private boards like Karnataka State Open Education Examination Board too running in the state, which are independent from KSEAB.

References 

1966 establishments in Mysore State
State agencies of Karnataka
Education in Karnataka
State secondary education boards of India
School examinations in India
Government agencies established in 1966